Lloydminster is a city in Canada which has the unusual geographic distinction of straddling the provincial border between Alberta and Saskatchewan. The city is incorporated by both provinces as a single city with a single municipal administration.

History 

Intended to be an exclusively British utopian settlement centred on the idea of sobriety, Lloydminster was founded in 1903 by the Barr Colonists, who came directly from the United Kingdom. At a time when the area was still part of the North-West Territories, the town was located astride the Fourth Meridian of the Dominion Land Survey. This meridian was intended to coincide with the 110° west longitude, although the imperfect surveying methods of the time led to the surveyed meridian being placed a few hundred metres (yards) west of this longitude.

The town was named for George Lloyd, an Anglican priest who would become Bishop of Saskatchewan in 1922. Lloyd was a strong opponent of non-British immigration to Canada. During a nearly disastrous immigration journey, which was badly planned and conducted, he distinguished himself with the colonists and replaced the Barr Colony's leader and namesake Isaac Montgomery Barr during the colonists' journey to the eventual townsite.

The town developed rapidly: by 1904, there was a telegraph office as well as a log church; in 1905, the Lloydminster Daily Times started publication and the first train arrived on July 28. Its main north-south street, today named Meridian Avenue (or 50th Avenue), along which stores, businesses and the post office began locating, was situated right on the Fourth Meridian, although the actual road right-of-way was located in Saskatchewan.

While provincehood of some sort for the prairie territories was seen as inevitable by 1903, it had been widely expected that only one province would eventually be created instead of two. The colonists were not aware of the federal government's deep-rooted opposition to the creation of a single province and thus had no way of knowing that the Fourth Meridian (110° W) was under consideration as a future provincial boundary. Had they known, it is very unlikely that they would have sited the new settlement on the future border.

When the provinces of Alberta and Saskatchewan were created in 1905, the Fourth Meridian was selected as the border, bisecting the town right along its main street. Caught by surprise, Lloydminster residents petitioned for the new border to be revised so as to encompass the entire town within Saskatchewan, without success.

For the next quarter century, Lloydminster remained to be administered as two separate towns with two separate municipal administrations. Finally, in 1930, the provincial governments agreed to amalgamate the towns into a single town under shared jurisdiction. The provinces, again jointly, reincorporated Lloydminster as a city in 1958.

Commemorating Lloydminster's distinctive bi-provincial status, a monument consisting of four 100-foot survey markers was erected in 1994 near the city's downtown core.

Although the majority of Lloydminster's population once lived in Saskatchewan, that ratio has long since been reversed; in the 2011 Canadian Census, nearly two-thirds of the city's population lived in Alberta. In 2000, the city hall and municipal offices were moved from Saskatchewan to Alberta in a location right along Meridian Avenue, also known as 50th Avenue, which runs along the Fourth Meridian.

Despite its bi-provincial status, Lloydminster was not exempted from anti-smoking legislation passed by the Legislative Assembly of Saskatchewan. Citizens responded by initiating a referendum against the wishes of the mayor, as permitted in the charter, which resulted in the enactment of a citywide anti-smoking bylaw. The matter became moot when Alberta enacted its own anti-smoking legislation, which was the solution that the mayor and council preferred.

Since Lloydminster's founders were attempting to create a utopian, temperance society, alcohol was not available in Lloydminster for the first few years after its founding.

Geography 

The provincial border runs north to south, falling directly on 50th Avenue (Meridian Avenue) in the centre of Lloydminster. Meridian Avenue north of the Yellowhead Highway (also named 44th Street) remains the main downtown street for stores, offices and businesses, with some also located on the intersecting east-west streets.  Addresses east of 50th Avenue are considered to be in Lloydminster, Saskatchewan and addresses west of 50th Avenue are considered to be in Lloydminster, Alberta. The city is bordered by the County of Vermilion River, Alberta, on the west, the Rural Municipality (R.M.) of Britannia No. 502, Saskatchewan, on the northeast and the R.M. of Wilton No. 472, Saskatchewan, on the southeast.  The majority of the large retail properties serving the city, including larger stores, gas stations and hotels, are located in its Alberta portion, in particular along the Yellowhead Highway west of Meridian Avenue and along the Alberta side of 50th Avenue south of the Yellowhead Highway.

Lloydminster's distinctive situation is reflected in other legal matters, including its time zone. Most of Saskatchewan does not observe daylight saving time, instead staying on Central Standard Time year-round. However, Alberta mandates daylight saving time. Lloydminster's charter allows the city to follow Alberta's use of daylight saving time on both sides of the provincial border in order to keep all clocks within the city in synchronisation. This has the effect of placing Lloydminster and the surrounding area in the Mountain Time Zone along with Alberta. During the summer therefore, the entire city is on UTC−06:00—Mountain Daylight Time, which is the same as the rest of Saskatchewan where the time is defined as Central Standard Time. During the winter, Lloydminster is on Mountain Standard Time with the rest of Alberta, which is UTC−07:00., and is therefore one hour behind the time in the rest of Saskatchewan.

The provincial line divides the city in two aspects related to communications. Telephones on the Saskatchewan side are assigned to area codes 306 and 639, the two area codes assigned to that province, while land lines on the Alberta side have numbers in the 780 and 587 area codes, the two area codes assigned to northern Alberta. Similarly, Saskatchewan addresses have a postal code with a forward sortation area designation (first three characters) of "S9V", and addresses in Alberta have postal codes beginning with "T9V". All postal codes in Canada beginning with the letter "S" are assigned to Saskatchewan, and those beginning with "T" belong to Alberta.

Climate 
Lloydminster experiences a humid continental climate (Köppen climate classification Dfb), which approaches a subarctic climate (Köppen Dfc) due to May and September being only marginally above . Winters are long, cold and dry, while summers are short, warm and moderately wet.

Demographics 

Of the 31,377 residents, 19,740 lived on the Alberta side and 11,637 lived on the Saskatchewan side.

There are substantial demographic differences between the populations on each side of the border, with the population on the Saskatchewan side being substantially younger; the median age on the Saskatchewan side is 26.6, nearly seven years less than the median age of 33.2 on the Alberta side. Even when combining the median ages for both sides of the city, Lloydminster has the youngest median age in all of Canada. Also, the specific age group of 20–24 is much more concentrated on the Saskatchewan side. The two sides of the city have virtually identical numbers of people in that age group (1,220 in Saskatchewan, 1,230 in Alberta) even though the total population on the Alberta side is nearly twice that of the Saskatchewan side. This situation has been attributed in part to differential car insurance rates for drivers; because Saskatchewan has a public auto insurance system while Alberta relies on conventional private insurance, young drivers with the highest insurance rates can save thousands of dollars by living in Saskatchewan rather than Alberta.

The census agglomeration of Lloydminster includes both parts of the city, as well as the rural municipality of Wilton No. 472, the town of Lashburn, and the village of Marshall, Saskatchewan.

About 94% of residents identified English as their first language. More than 1.4% of the population identified French as their first language, while 0.8% identified German, 0.7% identified Ukrainian, and 0.5% identified Cree as their first language learned. The next most common languages were Chinese and Spanish at about 0.3% each.

More than 78% of residents identified as Christian at the time of the 2001 census, while over 18% indicated that they had no religious affiliation. For specific denominations Statistics Canada found that 31% of residents identified as Roman Catholic, and 44% Protestants of which, 18% identified with the United Church of Canada, more than 7% identified as Anglican, about 5% identified as Lutheran, almost 3% identified as Pentecostal, about 2% identified as Baptists, and just over 1% of the population identified as Eastern Orthodox.

More than 8% of residents identified themselves as aboriginal at the time of the 2006 census.

Economy 

The local economy is driven primarily by the petroleum industry. Agriculture remains an important economic activity. The Husky Lloydminster Refinery is also located in the community. An issue in business is the sales tax. The only sales tax applicable in Alberta is the federal Goods and Services Tax (GST). Saskatchewan has, in addition to GST, a provincial sales tax (PST). To ensure that business will not float away from the Saskatchewan side in favour of lower prices in Alberta, PST does not apply in the Saskatchewan side of the city with the exception of hotels, vehicle registration and utility services.

Government 
Lloydminster is governed by a seven-member city council, consisting of a mayor and six city councillors. The city follows the Saskatchewan schedule when voting in municipal elections.

Residents on the Alberta side are in the electoral district of Lakeland for elections to the federal House of Commons, and Vermilion-Lloydminster-Wainwright for elections to the Legislative Assembly of Alberta. Residents in Saskatchewan are in Battlefords—Lloydminster federally, and Lloydminster for the Legislative Assembly of Saskatchewan.

Taxation 
Lloydminster's bi-provincial status has resulted in special provisions regarding provincial taxation within the city limits. The Saskatchewan side of the city is exempt from that province's sales tax, preventing businesses located there from being placed at a disadvantage relative to businesses in Alberta, which has no provincial sales tax. There is no exemption for provincial income tax, which is based solely on the taxpayer's province of residence. Other differences surrounding interprovincial costs are reflected within the treatment of automobile insurance, and housing taxes. For example, a driver under age 25 who lives on the Alberta side will pay approximately 2-3 times the average amount required of a Saskatchewan driver of the same age.

Infrastructure

Health care 
Lloydminster relies on health care resources from both Alberta Health Services and the Saskatchewan Health Authority. The Lloydminster Hospital was constructed in 1987 on the Saskatchewan side of the border. 

In 2013, an independent report found that Lloydminster was underserved by health care services in comparison to similar catchment areas in Alberta.  In 2007, Lloydminster was deemed to have outgrown the capacity of its hospital; calls for more operating rooms, acute care beds, and a dedicated MRI unit did not come to fruition, resulting in patients sometimes having to travel to larger cities such as Saskatoon for operations. Due to health data privacy laws in both provinces, the Lloydminster Hospital does not have direct access to AHS patient records, which have led to Alberta-based patients sometimes bringing their own paper records or receiving diagnostic tests a second time.

The city's contracts with WPD to provide ambulance service in Lloydminster have faced criticism over unsatisfactory performance, with some patients having had to wait up to 40 minutes for help to arrive; in August 2021, AHS pulled out of the contract and signed with a different provider, but WPD invoked an arbitration clause in Saskatchewan law that has prevented the SHA from immediately exiting the contract.

Transportation
The city is served by Lloydminster Airport. The Yellowhead Highway, (Alberta Highway 16 and Saskatchewan Highway 16) passes through the city from west to east, and Highway 17 (which is considered part of both Alberta's and Saskatchewan's highway system and is maintained by both provinces) travels along the provincial border from south to north.  There is no local public transport serving the city.

Education 
Elementary and secondary schools on both sides of the border all use Saskatchewan's curriculum. Lloydminster provides public and catholic education up to grade 12 as well as post-secondary education through Lakeland College, offering one and two year certificate and diploma programs.

Media 

Newspapers
 Lloydminster Meridian Booster, serves Lloydminster and area, circulating to 15,000 homes. Published Monday, Wednesday and Friday each week.
 Lloydminster Source is a free weekly newspaper, distributed each Tuesday and Thursday.

Radio

Television
Lloydminster is served by two broadcast television stations, operated as part of a twinstick operation owned by Newcap Radio:

Notable people 
Ron Adam - Canadian Football League (CFL) defensive back
Colby Armstrong - National Hockey League (NHL) forward
Calvin Ayre - Founder of the online gambling company Bodog
Garnet "Ace" Bailey - NHL forward, died on United Airlines Flight 175
Leon Benoit - Canadian politician
Samuel Delbert Clark - sociologist
Joan Crockatt - Canadian politician, journalist
Cory Cross - NHL defenceman
David Dziurzynski - NHL forward
Rosemarie Falk - Canadian politician
Scott Hartnell - NHL forward
Braden Holtby - NHL goaltender
Skip Krake - NHL forward who now lives in Lloydminster
Clarke MacArthur - NHL forward
Lucella MacLean - AAGPBL utility
James Hanna McCormick - Northern Irish politician
Keith Morrison - journalist, newscaster
Wade Redden - NHL defenceman
Richard Starke - Canadian politician
James Till - biophysicist who helped demonstrate the existence of stem cells
Lance Ward - NHL defenceman
Tyler Weiman - NHL goaltender
Colleen Young - Saskatchewan politician
Tanner Novlan - Actor

See also 

Flin Flon, a town split between Manitoba and Saskatchewan
List of communities in Alberta
List of communities in Saskatchewan
List of cities in Alberta
List of cities in Saskatchewan

References

External links 

 
1903 establishments in the Northwest Territories
Borders of Alberta
Borders of Saskatchewan
Cities in Alberta
Cities in Saskatchewan
Divided cities
Populated places established in 1903